Saugeen may refer to the following in Ontario, Canada:

Chippewas of Saugeen Ojibway Territory, the name applied to Chippewas of Nawash Unceded First Nation and Saugeen First Nation as a collective
Ojibway Nation of Saugeen First Nation, Ojibwa First Nation
Saugeen First Nation, Ojibway First Nation located along the Saugeen River and Bruce Peninsula
Saugeen Kame Terraces, 431 hectare provincially significant Earth Science Area of Natural and Scientific Interest
Saugeen River, tributary of Lake Huron
Saugeen Shores, town in Bruce County
Saugeen Shores Winterhawks, senior hockey team based out of Saugeen Shores
Saugeen Tract Agreement, signed August 9, 1836 between the Saugeen Ojibwa and Ottawa and the government of Upper Canada
Saugeen–Maitland Hall, co-ed students' residence at the University of Western Ontario in London